Cecil Harris may refer to:
 Cecil Harris (footballer, born 1905), English footballer for Hibernian and Darlington
 Cecil Harris (footballer, born 1896), English footballer for Aston Villa and Grimsby Town
 Cecil E. Harris, American schoolteacher, naval aviator and flying ace
 Seal Harris (Cecil Harris), African American heavyweight boxer